The Albatros C.IV, (Company post-war designation L.12). was a German military reconnaissance aircraft built in the autumn of 1915 by Albatros Flugzeugwerke. It was a single-engined biplane, and was based on the Albatros C.III, with which it shared many parts. It was eventually abandoned, in favour of the C.V.

Design and development
The C.IV shared the same fuselage, landing gear, and tail section with the C.III, but Albatros changed the design of the wings and cockpit; the pilot was located in the rear cockpit. When it was tested in 1916, the expected results of the changes did not occur, and the project was abandoned in favour of a more promising prototype, which became the Albatros C.V.

The C.IV was armed with a forward-firing LMG 08/15 machine gun, and a rear-firing, Parabellum MG14 machine gun.

Specifications

Notes

References

Cowin, H.W. German and Austrian Aviation of World War I. Osprey Publishing Ltd, 2000 

1910s German military reconnaissance aircraft
C.04
Single-engined tractor aircraft
Biplanes
Aircraft first flown in 1916